Salaga is a 2021 Indian Kannada-language action thriller film directed by Duniya Vijay in his directorial debut and produced by KP Srikanth. It features Duniya Vijay himself along with Sanjana Anand, Daali Dhananjay, and Nagabhushan in prominent roles. The film was released on 14 October 2021.

Plot 
In Bangalore, Slum Shetty is a gangster, who along with former gangster-turned BBMP corporator Indra and Juttu Seena are controlling the Bangalore underworld. Shetty learns that a person named Thyagaraja Ramanna is smuggling illegal arms from Mangalore Port for Salaga, who is operating from prison. Shetty sends Suri Anna to deal with him. Learning about Ramanna's attack, Salaga hires a cold-blooded gang named Batsman boys and kills Suri at a bar. Suri's brother Kenda is enraged and vows to kill Salaga. The trio, along with Kenda, learns that Salaga is released from prison, where they attempt to kill him, but Salaga escapes and kills Kenda, with the help of Batsman boys. 

Salaga's childhood girlfriend Sanjana pursues Salaga to accept her love proposal, but he refuses where after much insistence, Salaga agrees. After increase in crime rates, The city commissioner appoints ACP Samrat to deal with the underworld. Salaga tracks Seena at the market, where he along with the Batsman boys kill him. With a person named Savithri's help, Samrat tracks down the Batsman boys and kills them. Due to Seena's death, Shetty gets scared of his gang and family members, where he gets into a road accident and admitted to a hospital. Salaga reaches the hospital and kills him, where he discreetly escapes with Sanjana and surrenders at the court. Samrat interrogates Salaga who reveals his past. 

Salaga's real name was Vijay Kumar, who was from Uttar Karnataka. He arrived in Bangalore with his headmaster father and mother for his education. Vijay's father learns that their village people are also working as a coolies in the city, where he teaches their children, in order for them to be educated, but was ridiculed by Indra, Shetty, Seena and SI Ashwath, who makes the coolies believe their false statements for doing good to them. One day, Vijay thrashed Naga, when he harassed Sanjana's friend Kavya, where he was arrested by Ashwath in charges of killing Naga. Vijay tried to prove his innocence to his father and mother, but to no avail, After facing the embarrassment by their people, Vijay's father and mother committed suicide, leaving Vijay devastated. 

Vijay was sent to a remand home where he learnt that Naga was actually killed by Slum Shetty, Seena and Indra, upon the request of Ashwath, as he suspected Vijay to be Kavya's (Ashwath's daughter) boyfriend and also wanted to embarrass Vijay's father. After his release from remand home, Vijay killed Ashwath where he was arrested again and sentenced to prison. After revealing his past to Samrat, Salaga escapes by shooting himself in his leg and blames Samrat for encounter-killing him. After the enquiry at the court, Salaga is released due to lack of evidence. Salaga tracks down Indra at a temple festival to kill him, After a confrontation with Samrat, Salaga manages to capture Indra and kills him, thus avenging his parents' death. Salaga surrenders himself to Samrat, where he is taken to prison.

Cast
Duniya Vijay as Vijay Kumar / Salaga  
Sridhar H Krishna as Young Vijay
Sanjana Anand as Sanjana 
Dhananjay as ACP Samrat 
BV Bhaskar as SI Bhaskar
Nagabhushan as Vijay's Lawyer 
Achyuth Kumar as Police Commissioner
Cockroach Sudhi as Savitri
Sampath Maitreya as Vijay's Father
Usha Ravishankar as Vijay's Mother
Yashwanth Shetty as Slum Shetty
Channakeshava as Juttu Seena
Neenasam Ashwath as SI Ashwath, Corrupt Officer
Sathyanarayan Ummatthal as Sathyanna , Constable
Rockline Sudhakar as Sanjana's Father
Apoorva as Sanjana's Mother
Shambhavi Venkatesh as Shetty's Wife
Dinesh as Suri Anna
Shreshta as Kenda, Suri's Brother

Production
Filming started in Bangalore in June 2019. In October 2019, it was reported that the film was in its last leg of production.

Soundtrack 

The film's background score was composed by Charan Raj, with songs composed by Naveen Sajju.

Box office
The film collected ₹15.31 crores on first week and end up grossing over ₹22 crores at Box-office. Pinkvilla reported that the film had collected  in 25 days and became a commercial success at the box office.

Awards and nominations

References

External links
 

2021 films
2020s Kannada-language films
2021 directorial debut films
Films shot in Bangalore
Films postponed due to the COVID-19 pandemic
Films scored by Charan Raj